Robert Curtis Brown (born Robert Nelson Brown, April 27, 1957) is an American television, film, and stage actor.

Early life
Brown was born in Bucks County, Pennsylvania, and was raised in Yardley, a suburb of Philadelphia, Pennsylvania. The middle of three children, he graduated from Pennsbury High School in 1975 and from Yale University in 1979 with a bachelor's degree in English and Theatre Studies from Yale College, and later a master's degree in 1982 from the Yale School of Drama.

Career
Brown was in a production of the J. Hartley Manners play Peg O' My Heart in 1987 at Molloy College.

In 1988, Brown appeared as Octavius Caesar in a New York Shakespeare Festival production of Julius Caesar at The Public Theatre.

He played a doctor in The Heidi Chronicles in 1990, winning the Drama-Logue award and being nominated for a Helen Hayes award for his role.

His performance in One of These Days at Matrix Theatre in Los Angeles in 1992 was well-received by T.H. McCulloh of the Los Angeles Times.

He performed in productions of Green Icebergs and Night and Her Stars at the South Coast Repertory in 1994.

In 1999, he played John Worthing in The Importance of Being Earnest. Michael Phillips of the Los Angeles Times wrote that Kaitlin Hopkins and Brown were the "aces" of the production.

Brown has appeared in many TV series throughout his career, with recurring roles in Herman's Head, Matlock, Beverly Hills, 90210, Suddenly Susan, Diagnosis Murder, Big Love, The Game, Shark All My Children, The Young and the Restless, Perception, General Hospital,  Barry, The Handmaid's Tale and Dear White People, among others. His longest-running television role was as Alec Kendall in Search for Tomorrow (1984–85).

Brown has also had a long film career. He played Mr. Evans in High School Musical 2, High School Musical 3: Senior Year and Sharpay's Fabulous Adventure , and has appeared in Trading Places, Legal Eagles, Stuart Saves His Family, Bean: The Movie, Bruce Almighty, Guess Who, Who's Your Caddy?, Halloween II, It's Complicated, Audrey, Undrafted, Step Sisters, Take Point, Ashfall, and more.

Filmography

Film

Television

Video games

References

External links
 
 

1957 births
American male film actors
American male stage actors
American male voice actors
American male television actors
Male actors from Pennsylvania
Living people
People from Bucks County, Pennsylvania
20th-century American male actors
Yale School of Drama alumni
Pennsbury High School alumni